18/3 can refer to:
 March 18, in MM/DD notation
 American wire gauge 18, 3 conductor wire, commonly used for thermostats in the United States